Dmitry Sergeyevich Kosenko (born 21 October 1986) is a former Russian professional association football player.

Club career
He played made his debut for FC Rostov on 13 July 2005 in a Russian Cup game against FC Luch-Energiya Vladivostok.

He played in the Russian Football National League for FC Metallurg Lipetsk in 2009.

External links
 
 

1986 births
Sportspeople from Rostov-on-Don
Living people
Russian footballers
Association football defenders
FC Rostov players
FC Metallurg Lipetsk players
FC Rotor Volgograd players